Campbellton is an unincorporated town in southwestern Fulton County, Georgia. It was the original county seat for Campbell County, Georgia until after it refused to allow the Atlanta & West Point Railroad line though, on account of the anticipated noise. The county seat and business activity shifted to nearby Fairburn which grew, and Campbellton's population dwindled. Campbell County then became part of Fulton in 1932.

References 

Campbellton United Methodist Church

Unincorporated communities in Fulton County, Georgia
Campbellton
Unincorporated communities in Georgia (U.S. state)
Former county seats in Georgia (U.S. state)